West Point is a cape and an unincorporated community located in the southwestern corner of Prince Edward Island, Canada.

West Point Lighthouse, a square tapered tower, was built in 1875 by the federal Department of Marine. The West Point Lighthouse Inn, Museum and Restaurant was established in 1984. The West Point Development Corporation, a non-profit organization, maintains the lighthouse as a navigational aid beacon, although the living quarters of the lighthouse are now used as a unique country inn and museum.

This lighthouse was first lit on May 21, 1876.

Cedar Dunes Provincial Park is located at West Point and provides a supervised public beach for swimming.

West Point is not the westernmost extreme point of Prince Edward Island; that is West Cape, several kilometres to the north and slightly west.

Part of the very large West Cape Wind Farm is located in West Point.

References

Communities in Prince County, Prince Edward Island
Headlands of Prince Edward Island